The Bride Came Through the Ceiling (Swedish: Bruden kom genom taket) is a 1947 Swedish comedy film directed by Bengt Palm and starring Annalisa Ericson, Stig Järrel and Karl-Arne Holmsten. It was shot at the Centrumateljéerna Studios in Stockholm and on location in the city including at the Central Station. The film's sets were designed by the art director Bertil Duroj. It incorporated footage of Ericson on stage from the 1940 comedy Kiss Her!.

Synopsis
After a series of burglaries in Stockholm, a mysterious and attractive young woman crashes through a glass ceiling into an apartment of a middle-class family below.

Cast
 Annalisa Ericson as 	Marianne Linnér
 Stig Järrel as 	Sigvard Lejoncrona
 Karl-Arne Holmsten as 	Ragnar Lejoncrona
 Gunnar Björnstrand as 	Sune Eriksson
 Elsa Carlsson as Augustine Lejoncrona
 Douglas Håge as 	Konstapel Karlsson
 Hjördis Petterson as 	Fru Linnér
 Nils Ekstam as 	Putte Linnér, kriminalkommissarie
 Carl Hagman as 	Polis på polisstationen
 Margit Andelius as 	Karin Andersson
 Wiktor Andersson as 	Korvgubbe
 Saga Sjöberg as Anna-Greta Linnér
 Gunnar Johansson as 	Orkesterledare
 Birger Åsander as 	Poliskonstapel

References

Bibliography 
 Qvist, Per Olov & von Bagh, Peter. Guide to the Cinema of Sweden and Finland. Greenwood Publishing Group, 2000.

External links 
 

1947 films
Swedish comedy films
1947 comedy films
1940s Swedish-language films
Films directed by Bengt Palm
Swedish black-and-white films
Films shot in Stockholm
1940s Swedish films